Rowan Milnes (born 1 September 1999) is an English professional rugby league footballer who plays as a  or  for Hull Kingston Rovers in the Betfred Super League.

He previously played for the Bradford Bulls in League 1 and the Championship, and has also spent time on loan from Hull KR at Bradford.

Background
Milnes was born in Bradford, West Yorkshire, England.

He is a product of the Bradford Bulls Academy system. He signed a professional contract with the Bulls prior to the 2018 season.

Bradford Bulls
2018 - 2018 Season

Milnes featured in the pre-season friendlies against Halifax R.L.F.C., Sheffield Eagles and Dewsbury Rams. He scored against Halifax R.L.F.C. (1 goal) and Sheffield Eagles (2 goals).

Rowan played in Round 2 (London Skolars) then in Round 10 (Newcastle Thunder).

2019 - 2019 Season

Rowan featured in the pre-season friendlies against York City Knights, Dewsbury Rams, Batley Bulldogs and Toronto Wolfpack. He scored against Dewsbury Rams (2 goals) and Batley Bulldogs (1 goal).

Milnes played in Round 3 (Sheffield Eagles) then in Round 8 (Leigh Centurions) to Round 14 (Halifax R.L.F.C.). Milnes also featured in the 2019 Challenge Cup in Round 4 (Keighley Cougars) to Quarter Final (Halifax R.L.F.C.). He scored against Leigh Centurions (1 goal), Dewsbury Rams (1 try), Halifax R.L.F.C. (1 try, 3 goals), Toronto Wolfpack (1 try) and Leeds Rhinos (4 goals). Following the financial issues at the club, he signed for Hull Kingston Rovers along with four other Bradford players, however Milnes was loaned back to the Bulls for the 2020 season.

2020 - 2020 Season

Rowan featured in the pre-season friendlies against Castleford Tigers, Leeds Rhinos, Dewsbury Rams and York City Knights. He scored against Castleford Tigers (1 try, 2 goals) and Dewsbury Rams (2 goals).

Milnes played in Round 1 (London Broncos) to Round 5 (Sheffield Eagles). Rowan also featured in the 2020 Challenge Cup in Round 4 (Underbank Rangers) to Round 5 (Wakefield Trinity). He scored against Featherstone Rovers (3 goals), Underbank Rangers (1 try, 3 goals), Oldham R.L.F.C. (5 goals), Sheffield Eagles (4 goals) and Wakefield Trinity (1 try, 3 goals).

Statistics
Statistics do not include pre-season friendlies.

References

External links
Hull Kingston Rovers profile
SL profile
Bulls profile

1997 births
Living people
Bradford Bulls players
Dewsbury Rams players
English rugby league players
Hull Kingston Rovers players
Rugby league halfbacks
Rugby league players from Bradford